City Yard is a public art work by artist Sheila Klein, located at the Wisconsin Center in downtown Milwaukee, Wisconsin. The artwork consists of landscape elements, limestone architectural ornament, and salvaged public works objects such as fire hydrants and the classic blue police call box.

1998 sculptures
Outdoor sculptures in Milwaukee
Sculptures in Wisconsin
1998 establishments in Wisconsin